The London Gas Museum was a museum in Bromley-by-Bow in east London, England.

It was situated on Twelvetrees Crescent, London E3 3JG, on the eastern side of the River Lea and near to Bromley-by-Bow tube station.  The building dates from 1905 when it was part of a gas works and is still known as the London Gas Museum for post. Amongst other exhibits, it held a gas-powered radio, and an assortment of survey maps for gas companies.

Closure
In 1998, the museum started preparing to close, and distributed its collections to various entities.  
The former contents were merged with the collection in the Leicester Gas Museum.

The building is now occupied by offices.

References

Gas museums
Former buildings and structures in the London Borough of Newham
Defunct museums in London
Bromley-by-Bow